Win Aung (born 13 June 1974) is a Burmese politician who currently serves as a Pyithu Hluttaw member of parliament for Momauk Township Constituency. He is a member of the National League for Democracy.

Early life and education
Win Aung was born in Mogaung Township, Kachin State on 13 June 1974. He graduated B.Sc (Zoology) from Myitkyina University. His former work is Tuition teacher.

References

National League for Democracy politicians
1974 births
Living people
Members of Pyithu Hluttaw
People from Kachin State